John William Burton-Race (born 1 May 1957) is a British Michelin starred chef, television personality and celebrity chef, made famous by the Channel 4 series French Leave and its sequel Return of the Chef and I'm a Celebrity...Get Me Out of Here!.

Early life
Burton-Race was born in Singapore, raised by his mother and stepfather, who was a United Nations official. Burton-Race's biological father, whom he contacted as an adult, was a geologist. Burton-Race spent his early years travelling, allowing him to experience food from all round the world. He attended St Mary's College, Southampton.

Career
Between 1983 and 2002, he held positions at various restaurants in the South of England, including Le Manoir aux Quat' Saisons, Oxford; the L'Ortolan restaurant in Berkshire; and in 2000, he took over The Landmark London hotel, winning two Michelin stars. In 1995 Burton Race won a Catey Award.

After a 1990 television debut in Masterchef, Burton Race served as food consultant for the BBC Lenny Henry series Chef!. French Leave saw Burton Race move to France in 2002. He returned to the UK to purchase and run the restaurant/hotel The New Angel in Dartmouth, a seaside town in Devon. It was awarded a Michelin star in 2005.

In 2006, Burton Race lost to Michael Caines when the pair were challenged to represent the South West of England in the BBC television series Great British Menu. Following the collapse of his second marriage, in 2007 Burton-Race became a mentor on BBC cooking show Kitchen Criminals, and a judge of ITV cooking show Britain's Best Dish. He was one of three judges on the daytime food show Britain's Best Dish (2007–2011), alongside Jilly Goolden and Ed Baines.

In spring 2009, he appeared as a mentor on the ITV show Taste The Nation, a contestant on the BBC Two show Put Your Menu Where Your Mouth Is, and a contestant on Let's Dance for Comic Relief, dancing to Michael Jackson's Thriller. In summer 2009, Burton-Race appeared on the ITV daytime food show Daily Cooks Challenge.

Burton-Race left The New Angel in 2010, Burton-Race joined Unitas, and has since consulted for various restaurants a, hotels and food chains. In 2012 Burton-Race joined Adams Foods as Brand Ambassador and Executive Development Chef for Kerrygold and Pilgrims Choice, and also entered the retail market with his CookedBy John Burton-Race brand.

In 2013, he competed in the new edition of BBC One series Put your Menu where your Mouth is, and filmed reality series Celebrity Super Spa for Channel 5.

As of 2017, Burton-Race is heading the brasserie and terrace restaurant team at the refurbished Grosvenor Hotel in Torquay Devon, recently renamed John Burton-Race Restaurant with Rooms, which has been awarded two AA Rosettes. In August 2018, Burton-Race announced via his Twitter account that he was leaving the Richardson Hotel Group and would be departing from the John Burton-Race Restaurant with Rooms and was seeking new adventures.

I'm a Celebrity
In November 2007, he appeared in ITV's I'm a Celebrity, Get Me Out of Here! During the series, he had a number of severe falling outs with fellow contestant Lynne Franks, as the two of them had such opposite and extreme personalities. He was also the camp's main cook, and disliked fellow contestant Janice Dickinson's refusal to eat certain types of meat, such as kangaroo, crocodile and possum.  Burton-Race was voted out of I'm a Celebrity by the public on 24 November, the fifth person to leave the 2007 series. During his final chat with presenters Ant & Dec, he explained that as a chef, he had a very open mind with trying new types of food, and that was why he disliked Dickinson's refusal to eat the food he had prepared.

Personal life
Burton-Race has been married three times, and has five children:
Marie-Christine (1978-1996): two children, Naomi Burton-Race and Stuart Burton-Race. 
Kim (1996-2007): started an affair, after meeting at a friend's wedding in the Caribbean. They have two children together, and lived in a Georgian rectory in the village of Ashprington, near Totnes, with Kim's four children from her previous marriage.
Susan (2005–present)

As part of a divorce settlement with Kim, Burton-Race was required to liquidate his assets, including the family home and The New Angel. Kim closed The New Angel on 27 November 2007 whilst Burton-Race was in the Australian Outback on ITV programme I'm A Celebrity, Get Me Out of Here. The New Angel reopened a year later, after being bought by a friend, with Burton-Race back in charge.
Despite previous press reports of assets over £3 million, Kim and John Burton-Race each declared themselves bankrupt in 2009.

References

External links
 John Burton Race official website

1957 births
Living people
Singaporean emigrants to the United Kingdom
British chefs
English television personalities
Head chefs of Michelin starred restaurants
I'm a Celebrity...Get Me Out of Here! (British TV series) participants